Musa bin Hassan (born 13 September 1951) is a retired Malaysian police officer who has served as one of the member of the Board of Directors of the Universiti Sains Islam Malaysia (USIM) since May 2020. His appointment is set to last for 3 years, his current term as a board member expires in May 2023. He also served as the eighth Inspector-General of Police from September 2006 to September 2010 for 4 years and was a senior Royal Malaysian Police (PDRM) for 40 years.

Police career timeline
1969 – Insp. Trainee (PDRM College, Kuala Kubu Baru)

1970 – Inspector Special Investigation unit (IPD Melaka Tengah)/Probationary Inspector

1973 – Prosecuting Officer (IPD Alor Gajah)/Inspector

1975 – PT CAD Records/Statistics (Anti – Drug Branch, JSJ Bukit Aman)/Inspector

1981 – PPP Bahagian 'A' CAD (Anti  – Drug Branch, JSJ Bukit Aman)/ASP

1985 – PPP CAD Technical Assistance Specialist (Anti  – Drug Branch, JSJ Bukit Aman)/ASP

1986 – Lecturer in Law (PDRM College, Kuala Kubu Baru)/ASP

1988 – Deputy Head of Law School (PDRM College, Kuala Kubu Baru)/DSP

1991 – TPP Training B1 (Training Branch, Bukit Aman Management Department)/DSP

1992 – PP Training (Examination) (Training Branch, Bukit Aman Management Department)/Supt

1995 – Assistant Director of Prosecution/Law (JSJ Bukit Aman)/ACP

1997 – Assistant Director of Prosecution/Law (JSJ Bukit Aman)/SAC II

2000 – Deputy Director II (JSJ Bukit Aman)/SAC I

2001 – Deputy Director I (JSJ Bukit Aman)/DCP

2003 – Johor Police Chief/DCP

2004 – Director of JSJ (JSJ Bukit Aman)/CP

2005 – Deputy Inspector General of Police/DIG

2006 – Inspector General of Police/IGP

2010 – Retired from the force at 58

Inspector-General of Police 
He took over the post from Mohd Bakri Omar in September 2007; Hassan had previously worked as Deputy Inspector-General under him.

Soon after he was investigated on allegations of corruption related to the release of three members of illegal betting syndicates, however, Attorney-General Abdul Gani Patail ordered the Anti-Corruption Agency to close the investigations in July 2007 for lack of evidence. Two months later, it was announced that he would receive a two-year extension of his term to 13 September 2008, despite having reached the mandatory retirement age.

In March 2010, Home Minister Datuk Seri Hishammuddin Hussein said that the government will find a replacement for Inspector General of Police Musa Hassan shortly.

Finally, on 13 September 2010 Musa resigned as Inspector-General of Police after serving for more than 3 years. Subsequently, his deputy, Tan Sri Ismail Omar, was promoted to be the new Inspector-General. On 29 April, Musa was appointed as Pakatan Rakyat's security advisor.

Post-Retirement
After retiring police service Musa spent life as retirement person while he speak up about integrity police force,crime nowdays and another related, even often invited by many parties about his views on current issue.In late 2021 until mid 2022 he is involved with a organization about against human trafficking and scam syndicate

Family
Musa Hassan, a Malay of Banjarese descent, is the eldest son of Hassan Azhari (1928–2019), a Koran teacher and famous Qiraati in Malaysia. He received his education in Kuala Lumpur, and has two brothers, Fuad Hassan, a politician (1949–2014), and a younger one, Jalaluddin Hassan (born 1954), an actor. He was from Bukit Bintang Boys' Secondary School.

Honours
  :
 Member of the Order of the Defender of the Realm (AMN) (1984)
 Officer of the Order of the Defender of the Realm (KMN) (1996)
 Commander of the Order of Loyalty to the Crown of Malaysia (PSM) – Tan Sri (2006) 
 Commander of the Order of the Defender of the Realm (PMN) – Tan Sri (2007)
 Royal Malaysia Police :
 Courageous Commander of the Most Gallant Police Order (PGPP) (2005)
 :
 Knight Companion of the Order of Sultan Salahuddin Abdul Aziz Shah (DSSA) – Dato’ (2000)
 Knight Grand Commander of the Order of the Crown of Selangor (SPMS) – Dato’ Seri (2006)
 :
 Grand Knight of the Order of the Crown of Pahang (SIMP) – formerly Dato’, now Dato’ Indera (2004)
 Grand Knight of the Order of Sultan Ahmad Shah of Pahang (SSAP) – Dato’ Sri (2005)
 :
 Knight Commander of the Exalted Order of Malacca (DCSM) – Datuk Wira (2006)
 :
 Knight Grand Commander of the Order of the Life of the Crown of Kelantan (SJMK) – Dato’ (2007)
 Recipient of the Order of the Most Distinguished and Most Valiant Warrior (PYGP) (2010)
 :
 Knight Grand Commander of the Order of the Crown of Perlis (SPMP) – Dato’ Seri (2007)
 :
 Knight Commander of the Most Exalted Order of the Star of Sarawak (PNBS) – Dato Sri (2007)
 :
 Knight Grand Commander of the Order of Taming Sari (SPTS) – Dato’ Seri Panglima (2008)

Foreign Honours
 :
 Recipient of the Darjah Utama Bakti Cemerlang (DUBC) (2009)
 :
 Recipient of the Order of Setia Negara Brunei (PSNB)
 :
 Knight Grand Cordon of Order of the Crown of Thailand (KGC)

References

External links
 S Ramesh (2009) Malaysian police chief conferred with Distinguished Service Order, www.channelnewsasia.com

Malaysian police officers
People from Selangor
Malaysian police chiefs
Living people
1951 births
Malaysian people of Malay descent
People from Kuala Lumpur
Malaysian people of Banjar descent
Malaysian Muslims
Recipients of the Darjah Utama Bakti Cemerlang
Members of the Order of the Defender of the Realm
Officers of the Order of the Defender of the Realm
Commanders of the Order of Loyalty to the Crown of Malaysia
Commanders of the Order of the Defender of the Realm
Knights Grand Commander of the Order of the Crown of Selangor
Knights Commander of the Most Exalted Order of the Star of Sarawak